The Flanders Marine Institute (Dutch: Vlaams Instituut voor de Zee, VLIZ) provides a focal point for marine scientific research in Flanders, northern Belgium.

The Flemish government established the institute in 1999 together with the province of West Flanders and the Fund for Scientific Research.
VLIZ promotes the accumulation of knowledge and excellence in research with regard to the ocean, seas, coasts and tidal estuaries. The central focus is on the provision of services to the research community, educators, the general public, policymakers and the industry.

VLIZ promotes and supports Flemish marine research. Within this scope, VLIZ focuses on open, useful networking and the promotion of an integrated and cross-disciplinary approach. VLIZ serves as a national and international point of contact in the field of marine research. In this respect, it supports the image of Flemish marine research in the four corners of the globe and can hold mandates to represent this research landscape.

The institute also supports and accommodates international organisations on behalf of the Flemish government: the IOC Project Office for IODE, the European Marine Board secretariat and the European Marine Observation and Data Network (EMODnet) secretariat in Ostend, and the Joint Programming Initiative on Healthy and Productive Seas and Oceans (JPI Oceans) secretariat in Brussels.

VLIZ also manages RV Simon Stevin a marine research vessel.
Making the research vessel Simon Stevin, marine robots as well as other research equipment and infrastructure available is one of the services provided to marine scientists in Flanders. Within a European context, VLIZ offers technical and operational expertise for the use of this infrastructure. It stimulates and initiates research based on these innovative technologies.

VLIZ also develops data systems, products, technologies and infrastructure. It collects new data by means of innovative techniques and valorises the increasing volume of marine data for the benefit of researchers, policymakers and the industry. In partnership with Flemish research groups, it develops permanent measurement networks at sea and presents itself to the world as a high-quality oceanographic data centre. The institute has developed and hosted the World Register of Marine Species and associated taxonomic subregisters, and hosts the Interim Register of Marine and Nonmarine Genera, and the Sea Level Monitoring Facility of the Global Sea Level Observing System. In November 2011 VLIZ was officially recognized as a World Data Center by the Paris-based International Council for Science (ICSU).

VLIZ manages an extensive collection of marine scientific literature in Flanders and makes it publicly available to the broadest possible target group via its library. The Open Marine Archive makes it possible to remotely consult tens of thousands of publications free of charge. In addition, VLIZ initiates and conducts innovative and multidisciplinary research in collaboration with and complementary to the Flemish and international marine research groups. By identifying needs and opportunities, it provides oxygen to the Flemish marine knowledge economy of the future. VLIZ develops policy-relevant products and services for the marine research community and policymakers as well as to support the blue economy. The ‘Compendium for Coast and Sea’ is a reliable guide listing who does what within this field in Flanders. VLIZ initiates, promotes and supports multidisciplinary research to fill knowledge gaps and provide a basis for marine policy. It does so in close cooperation with the Flemish marine research community. Finally, VLIZ reaches out to the public at large, the press, educators and coastal guides. The information desk offers knowledge presented in innovative formats and contributes to increasing ocean literacy by means of science popularisation, thus improving the image of the research conducted in Flanders and beyond.

References

Organizations established in 1999
Research institutes in Belgium
Flanders
Oceanography
Ostend
1999 establishments in Belgium